Hot Shot Hamish and Mighty Mouse were two popular British football-themed comic strips, which later merged and appeared in various publications from the 1970s to the 1990s. Both are amongst the best remembered football characters from the "golden age" of British boys' comics.

Both strips were written by Fred Baker (died 2008) and usually drawn by Julio Schiaffino (born 1936, died 23 June 2016) Hot Shot Hamish followed gentle Hebridean giant Hamish Balfour, the man with the most powerful shot in the world, and began its days in Scorcher in August 1973, before relocating to Tiger when the two titles merged. Hamish was brought from his remote island home to play for Princes Park in the Scottish Premier Division, under manager Ian McWhacker, and was famous for being able to hit the ball so hard that his shot could (and often did) burst the goal net. His powerful frame was emphasised by the fact that he always played in a shirt which was far too small for him and which did not reach the waistband of his shorts. Hamish's regular supporting characters were his eccentric father and his pet sheep McMutton.

Mighty Mouse, on the other hand, first appeared in the Roy of the Rovers comic in June 1979, and featured Kevin "Mighty" Mouse. Mouse was a successful and highly skillful First Division footballer despite the fact that he was very short, extremely overweight, and wore thick spectacles even while playing. He also managed to divide his time between playing for Tottenford Rovers and studying at St Victor's Hospital as a medical student. At the hospital he lived in fear of ferocious matron "Mad Annie", and his superior was the cantankerous Dr Mender, who also ran the hospital football team, for which Mouse played. As he was also a professional player, while all his teammates were amateurs, he was vastly more skillful than anyone else on the team.

In 1985, after the cancellation of Tiger, most of its strips moved to Eagle, but Hamish was re-located to Roy of the Rovers and the two strips merged to form Hot Shot Hamish and Mighty Mouse (later shortened to simply Hamish and Mouse). The first episode of the combined strip appeared in the Roy of the Rovers comic dated 6 April 1985. In the storyline, Mouse was deemed surplus to requirements at Tottenford Rovers after the signing of a more skillful player who played in the same position. On a trip to watch Scotland playing, he met up with Hamish, who persuaded him to sign for Princes Park (conveniently Mouse was also able to transfer to a Scottish hospital to continue his studies). In later years, the pair transferred to Glengow Rangers where they were later joined by McWhacker (who promptly signed a number of their former Princes Park teammates).

The strip ran until May 1990, returned in July of the same year, and finally came to an end in January 1993, with reprints appearing in the remaining issues of the weekly Roy of the Rovers comic.

A rarity among the genre of football strips, the Hamish and Mouse story was extremely humorous in nature, with unbelievable and exaggerated tricks and skills shown by the two lead characters, although they never degenerated into out and out pastiche in the style of Billy the Fish. Many characters had humorous names, for example the manager of the Scottish national team was called Mr McBossy. Storylines were often comical and highly far-fetched - one notable example saw Mr. McWhacker attempt to intimidate the Princes Park players into playing better by secretly disguising himself as a monster called "The Claw" and haunting the club corridors, bursting out and warning startled players that they would be devoured if they did not win matches.

Their adventures were also published in other European countries. In France they were known as Hamish La Foudre and Mousie L'Eclair, in Sweden as Super-Mac (Hamish) and Bullen (Mouse), and in Finland as Super-Mac and Pulla.

He was selected to play for Scotland making him Princes Park's first international player. During the match, his hot shot was saved by the opposing goalkeeper who actually caught it in his hands! His first goal was disallowed after a teammate fouled the keeper before he headed it in, but his father went into a rage at the referee and was dragged off by the police. Hamish had possession again giving a much harder hot shot than the first saying "Try this for size!". This time he scored, burst the net, hit the floodlight post causing the floodlights to collapse onto the pitch. The match was abandoned as a result.

Hot Shot Hamish

Club Career

In the early 70s Princes Park F.C. were the Cinderella of Scottish Football. Overshadowed by the great sides of Glasgow Princes Park languished at the foot of the Second division of the Scottish League but manager Ian McWhacker was determined the 1973-1974 season should see a vast improvement. This happened when the Princes Park team visited the Hebrides discovering Hamish Balfour, a boy with a figure of a giant and the most powerful shot in the world. Ian McWhacker said that Hamish could be the signing of the century!
Hamish soon became supporters favorite but after a fall-out with the directors he was placed on the transfer list. Crawford Town, an English club of the first division where the first to sign the new talent, with young Balfour debuting for them in a World Cup warm-up match against a South American team in London. But Princes Park's supporters demonstrated for his return which was realized shortly after, and Hamish gave them a massive compensation: Princes Park won the Scottish Cup for the very first time of its history in 1974 after beating Ratch Rovers at Hampden Park.
Within 6 years (1974-1980) thanks to Balfour's fireballs Princes Park would enjoy promotion to the Premier division, suffer relegation and promotion again. The 1979-80 found Princes Park back to the first division. Hamish Balfour would give the Cup to Princes Park for the second time in 1982, promotion to the topflight again and two years later he would stand on the high pedestal of Scottish Football, the Premier Division title. The Hebridiean giant having already debuted for the Scotland national team won his second cap in a match against Iceland in March 1985 under manager Ian McBossy. A distinguished career with Scotland wasn't meant to be but that was when he met Kevin Mouse who attended the match in Glasgow. The summer of the same year he helped Pongi FC win a game in Kenyan League while holidaying in Kenya with teammate Wee Wally.
Ian McWhacker had managed to build a strong team with the likes of Hamish Balfour, Kevin Mouse and Wee Wally. The all-conquering trio helped Princes Park be crowned Cup winners in 1987 and reached the top of Europe the following year by beating Bumchen Munchen in the European Cup Winners' Cup Final. One year later McWhacker signed Mouse and Balfour for his new team Glengow Rangers.
Scottish Cup winner again in 1990 and European season for Hamish Balfour but his career in Rangers never became as glamorous as it had been in Princes Park for 16 years. On 30 January 1993 after a horrible defeat in Scottish Cup, manager McWhacker quit leaving Balfour and Mouse in doubt over their future in Glengow Rangers.

2018 Roy of The Rovers Reboot

Hamish and Kevin Mouse later played for Melchester Rovers, Hamish only played for Rovers for a year before accepting a record transfer fee in Spain where he has been living since he retired, while Mouse stayed on with Rovers until he retired eventually becoming Rovers' manager. After Mouse suffers a heart attack near the end of Roy Race's first season as a professional Hamish takes over as Rovers' caretaker manager, his appointment didn't go down well with Johnny Dexter who becomes Rovers' assistant manager, nevertheless with Hamish in charge Rovers earned promotion to League 1 via the playoffs with Dexter's help. Hamish later returns to Melchester after Rovers gained automatic promotion to The Championship representing a Spanish based consortium of wealthy property developers that wishes to buy Rovers. The consortium have aspirations to rebuild Rovers' stadium Mel Park and officially integrate a women's team in Melchester called Sowerby into the Rovers setup which will make Sowerby a full-time women's side, the consortium also appoints Hamish with the position of Rovers club ambassador. Hamish's time as ambassador after Rovers takeover has seen Hamish as a mentor to the younger players, during the build up to the Premier League promotion play off final there was a striker shortage due to injuries and suspensions so Hamish was reactivated as a player which saw Hamish come on as a substitute and scoring the goal that put Rovers back in the Premier League which led to Hamish breaking his leg with the kick that promoted Rovers. He was seen in the stands watching Rovers beat local rivals Tynecaster to win the FA Cup

Mighty Mouse

Club career
Kevin 'Mighty' Mouse started his career playing part-time for non-league Alftown Hotcakes, where Mouse scored a solitary winning goal in a 1-0 win in the FA Cup 3rd round against League Champions Nottingpool United. Soon after he signed for Tottenford Rovers while studying at St Victor's Hospital, where he was a medical student with a dream to be a distinguished doctor. He played in UEFA Cup with Tottenford Rovers but in 1985 he moved up north to Glasgow teaming up with the gentle giant Hamish Balfour for the sake of Princes Park. He became part of the dynamic trio (Hamish-Mouse-Wee Wally) which sent Princes Park to the seventh heaven when they conquered the Cup Winners' Cup, the greatest accomplishment in the club's history. The final ended in 3-2 score in the favour of Park and Kevin Mouse played a key-role in this tremendous victory scoring one goal.
He would follow Balfour and manager Ian McWhacker to Glengow Rangers five years later helping the Gers win the Scottish Cup.

Managerial Career
Mighty Mouse was installed as the new Melchester Rovers manager in 2018 as seen in the new Roy of the Rovers strip in Match of the Day magazine.

Honours (Hamish Balfour)

Princes Park FC

Scottish Premier Division:
Winners (1): 1983-84Scottish Cup:Winners (4): 1973-74, 1981–82, 1986–87, 1989-90Scottish First Division (second tier)::Winners (2): 1982Scottish Second Division (third tier):Winners (1):UEFA Cup Winners' Cup: 11987-88

Glengow RangersScottish Cup:Winners (1): 1990-91Honours (Kevin Mouse)

Princes Park FCScottish Second Division (third tier):Winners (1):UEFA Cup Winners' Cup: 11987-88

Glengow RangersScottish Cup:Winners (1): 1990-91'''

References

Sources
Scorcher page at britishcomics.com
Official Roy of the Rovers website

British comic strips
British comics characters
Comics characters introduced in 1973
1973 comics debuts
Comics characters introduced in 1979
1979 comics debuts
1993 comics endings
Fictional association football players
Fictional Scottish people
Comic strip duos
Association football comics
Humor comics
Comics spin-offs